This list of Brigham Young University alumni includes notable graduates, non-graduate former students, and current students of Brigham Young University (BYU), a private, coeducational research university owned by the Church of Jesus Christ of Latter-day Saints (LDS Church) located in Provo, Utah, United States. It is the oldest existing institution within the LDS Church Educational System, is America's largest religious university, and has the second-largest private university enrollment in the United States. Approximately 98% of the 34,000 students at BYU are Mormon; two-thirds of its American students come from outside the state of Utah. In addition to its undergraduate program, BYU offers graduate degrees in 47 departments and includes two professional schools: the Marriott School of Business and the J. Reuben Clark Law School. , BYU has 443,426 living alumni.

Over 26 BYU graduates have served in the U.S. Senate and U.S. House of Representatives, such as former Dean of the U.S. Senate Reed Smoot (class of 1876). Cabinet members of American presidents include former United States Secretary of Agriculture to President Dwight D. Eisenhower, Ezra Taft Benson '26 and Rex E. Lee '60, who was U.S. Solicitor General under President Ronald Reagan. Mitt Romney, former Governor of Massachusetts and 2008 and 2012 Republican presidential nominee, was valedictorian of his class in 1971.

BYU alumni in academia include former Dean of the Harvard Business School Kim B. Clark, a vice president of Yale, Scott Strobel '87, and Michael K. Young '73, President of Texas A&M University and former President of the University of Washington. The university also graduated Nobel Prize winner Paul D. Boyer, as well as Philo Farnsworth (inventor of the electronic television) and Harvey Fletcher (inventor of the hearing aid). Seven of BYU's twelve presidents were alumni of the university. Alumni of BYU who have served as business leaders include Citigroup CFO Gary Crittenden '76, former Dell CEO Kevin Rollins '84, Deseret Book CEO Sheri L. Dew, and Matthew K. McCauley, CEO of children's clothing company Gymboree.

In literature and journalism, BYU has produced several best-selling authors, including Orson Scott Card '75, Brandon Sanderson '00 & '05, and Stephenie Meyer '95. Other media personalities include ESPN sportscaster and former Miss America Sharlene Wells Hawkes '86 and former co-host of CBS's The Early Show Jane Clayson Johnson '90. In entertainment and television, BYU is represented by Jon Heder '02 (best known for his role as Napoleon Dynamite), Golden Globe-nominated Aaron Eckhart '94, and Jeopardy! all-time champion Ken Jennings '00. In the music industry BYU is represented by former American Idol contestant Carmen Rasmusen and The Tabernacle Choir at Temple Square director Mack Wilberg.

BYU has also produced several leaders of religion. Alumni have comprised several General Authorities of the Church of Jesus Christ of Latter-day Saints, including two church presidents (Thomas S. Monson '74 and Ezra Taft Benson '26), six apostles (Neil L. Andersen, D. Todd Christofferson '69, David A. Bednar '76, Jeffrey R. Holland '65 & '66, Dallin H. Oaks '54, and Reed Smoot 1876), and two General Relief Society Presidents (Julie B. Beck '73 and Belle Spafford '20).

A number of BYU alumni have found success in professional sports, representing the university in 7 MLB World Series, 5 NBA Finals, and 25 NFL Super Bowls. In baseball, BYU alumni include All-Stars Rick Aguilera '83, Wally Joyner '84, and Jack Morris '76. Professional basketball players include three-time NBA Finals champion Danny Ainge '81 and three-time Olympic medalist Krešimir Ćosić '73. BYU also claims notable professional football players including Super Bowl MVP Steve Young '84 & '94, Heisman Trophy winner Ty Detmer '90, and two-time Super Bowl winner Jim McMahon. In golf, BYU alumni include two major championship winners: Johnny Miller ('69) at the 1973 U.S. Open and 1976 British Open and Mike Weir ('92) at the 2003 Masters.

Academia and research

University administration

Professors and researchers

Arts

Business and finance

Entertainment

Government and politics

Members of the United States Cabinet

United States governors

Members of the United States Congress 
Note: "D" indicates a Democrat while "R" indicates a Republican.

Senators

Representatives

United States state constitutional officers

Government officials outside the U.S.

Other U.S. political figures

Journalism and media

Law and judiciary

Justices of the Supreme Court of the United States

U.S. Circuit Judges

Justices of State Supreme Courts

U.S. District Judges

Literature, writing, and translation

Music

Religion 
Note: All positions listed are within the Church of Jesus Christ of Latter-day Saints unless otherwise noted.

Social reforms

Sports

Baseball

Basketball 

Frank Bartley (born 1994), basketball player for Ironi Ness Ziona of the Israeli Basketball Premier League
 Elijah Bryant (born 1995) – basketball player in the Israeli Basketball Premier League

Football

Track and field 

Andreas Gustafsson (born 1981), Swedish race walker

Soccer

Other sports

Other

Fictional people

See also 
 List of Brigham Young University faculty

Notes 
 Blank cells indicate missing information; em-dashes (—) indicate that the alumnus attended but never graduated from BYU.

References

External links 

 BYU Alumni Magazine
 BYU Alumni Association

 
Brigham Young University
Brigham Young University alumni
Brigham Young University